The office of Deputy Chief of Staff of the United States Army was organized under the office of the Chief of Staff of the United States Army which existed between 1921 and 1948 before being disbanded in favor of the Vice Chief of Staff of the United States Army.

The office was established administratively in 1921.

From 1921 to 1939 this office had no statutory basis for existence, an attempt was made to rectify this in the 3 June 1938 amendment to the National Defense Act of 1920. However, it failed to correct it.

Duties 

List

References

United States Army organization